Rihards Matrevics (born 18 March 1999) is a Latvian footballer who plays as a goalkeeper for Riga FC.

Club career
In 2015, Matrevics joined the youth academy of English Premier League side West Ham United from Latvian club SK Babīte, where he spent nine years. On 1 August 2018, Matrevics signed for National League club Barnet, following a successful trial period at the club. On 19 January 2019, Matrevics made his debut for Barnet, coming on as a fifth minute substitute for the Bees, following Mark Cousins' red card in a 4–0 loss against Braintree Town. In November 2019, Matrevics signed for Hendon on loan, making 14 appearances in all competitions for the club. The following season, Matrevics returned to Hendon on a permanent basis. During his second spell, Matrevics made three appearances in all competitions. In October 2020, Matrevics signed for St Albans City as back-up for Michael Johnson. Matrevics made two appearances, debuting in the FA Cup against Bishop's Stortford before keeping a clean sheet against Chippenham Town in a 3–0 league win on 31 October 2020, during his time at St Albans.

Ahead of the 2021 Latvian Higher League season, Matrevics returned to his native Latvia, signing for Valmiera. On 4 April 2021, Matrevics made his debut for the club, keeping a clean sheet in a 1–0 win against Ventspils. During the 2021 season, Matrevics made 24 league appearances as Valmiera finished second, qualifying for the 2022–23 UEFA Europa Conference League. 

On 8 December 2022, Matrevics signed for Riga FC.

International career
Matrevics has represented Latvia at under-16, under-17, under-19 and under-21 level. On 29 March 2022, Matrevics made his debut for Latvia, playing the second half in a 1–0 friendly win against Azerbaijan.

References

External links
 

1999 births
Living people
Latvian footballers
Association football goalkeepers
Latvia international footballers
West Ham United F.C. players
Barnet F.C. players
Hendon F.C. players
St Albans City F.C. players
Valmieras FK players
Riga FC players
National League (English football) players
Southern Football League players
Latvian Higher League players 
Latvia youth international footballers
Latvia under-21 international footballers
Latvian expatriate footballers
Latvian expatriate sportspeople in England
Expatriate footballers in England